The Fargo Marathon is an annual road running marathon in Fargo, North Dakota, first held in 2005.  Most years, it begins and ends inside the Fargodome, and the course also travels through Moorhead, Minnesota, Fargo's twin city. The event weekend also hosts a half marathon, 10K, and 5K.  The race is a USATF-qualified course, so marathon finish times can be used to qualify for the Boston Marathon. The event has been sponsored by Sanford Health.

History 

The first year's race weekend offered a 5K on Friday, and a marathon, marathon relay, and a half marathon on Saturday, starting at 8 a.m. Almost 3,000 runners were present for the races, and prize money was offered (including $400 for first place in the marathons). The race drew on local bands for music on the course (25 live bands were at the course in the early years), and local culture was prominent (those years featured a "pasta/lefse feed" for pre-race carbo-loading). The co-director told the press that the racers had raised $20,000 for two local charities: The Children's Museum at Yunker Farm and MeritCare Children's Hospital.

The race was founded and run by Mark Knutson at a time when local races were becoming more prominent as tourist attractions, but also as places where cities could build associations as being health-focused communities. The races also offered showcasing opportunities for area athletes that otherwise would have to travel elsewhere to have their talent recognized.

In the second year, the race weekend drew runners from 46 states, three countries, and had an estimated economic impact of a $1.5 million boost to the local businesses and charities. The half marathon was one of the most popular events, drawn nearly 2,000 runners. It also spawned a collaboration with the Lake Agassiz Arts Council, which sponsored a Native-focused "Herd About the Prairie" art exhibition. The exhibition placed a collection of 39 decorated buffalo sculptures (the size of real buffalo) throughout the marathon course.

In 2010, Runner's World reported the race held a high entry-fee-to-value quality.

As the race progressed in years, it maintained a reputation for being flat, fast, supportive, and loud (with the dozens of bands throughout the course, including rock, dance, oldies, Native drumming—and yes, polka). It has grown in numbers to more than 20,000 runners. The pre-race convention brings food, businesses and speakers to the event center for the thousands of runners and spectators. By 2014, the prize money for first place had also increased to $1,400, with multiple other prizes for top competitors.

In 2019, Knutson sold the race to Rugged Races, though Knutson stayed on as the race director.

In 2020, the first known case of the COVID-19 virus appeared in North Dakota on March 11. Within two days, the country began shutting down, and North Dakota issued a state of emergency. The marathon was rescheduled, but due to the rising number of cases in summer of 2020, it was clear the marathon could not continue. The race was canceled, with all registrants given the option of a refund, a postponement to 2021, or running the race on their own course and time.

Participation was at 50 percent of normal, as the race date was close to other Minnesota marathons: The postponed Med City Marathon, the smaller Ely Marathon and the larger Twin Cities Marathon. Race organizers also said the closed Canadian border kept runners away.

Media coverage

Radio coverage has been provided by KFGO. TV coverage has been provided by WDAY-TV, an ABC affiliate.

Course 

The marathon, half marathon, and 10K all start and finish inside the Fargodome.

The course goes through Concordia College's campus in Moorhead, Minnesota, where the Concordia Cobber hands out high-fives. It also circles through Minnesota State University Moorhead's campus, where the MSUM Dragon cheers on the runners.

The inside start and finish has become a notable draw for runners. It provides a stark contrast to what many locals deal with in the winter training months, as Olympic Trials Marathon qualifier Valeria Curtis stressed in a 2019 Runner's World article about training near her home in Minot, North Dakota.

In 2009, the course had to be changed due to flooding. The marathon route took two laps instead of one large loop.

In 2014, in celebration of 10 years of the race, the route changed. It started on the bridge, just as it did on the first year. The finish line wasn't inside; it was near the Fargo Theatre on Broadway Street in downtown Fargo. The change was only for one year.

Half marathon
Sammy Malakwen, a two-time winner, set the half marathon course record in 2010 at 1:04:27.

Repeat winners

Semehar Tesfaye has won the women's race three years in a row and set the course record in 2016. Tesfaye graduated from Fargo South High School.

Winners 

Key:

All cities in North Dakota unless indicated otherwise

*In 2009, the Red River flooded, forcing the marathon course to be two smaller loops.

**A "virtual" race was scheduled.

Participation

Notes

External links

Fargo Marathon YouTube channel

Notes 

Foot races in Minnesota
Marathons in North America
Marathons in the United States
Recurring sporting events established in 2005
Sports in Fargo, North Dakota
Tourist attractions in Cass County, North Dakota